See Mystery Lights is the fourth album by Portland, Oregon-based band Yacht. It is the first Yacht release to feature the band's eventual frontwoman, Claire L. Evans, as a full-time member. The album's cover art was designed by Boyd Elder. It was released on July 28, 2009 on DFA Records.

Track listing

References

External links

2009 albums
Yacht (band) albums
DFA Records albums